The 1962 Penn Quakers football team was an American football team that represented the University of Pennsylvania during the 1962 NCAA University Division football season. Penn finished sixth in the Ivy League. 

In their third year under head coach John Stiegman, the Quakers compiled a 3–6 record and were outscored 174 to 89. Bill Hardaker was the team captain.

Penn's 2–5 conference record placed sixth in the Ivy League. The Quakers were outscored 151 to 70 by Ivy opponents. 

Penn played its home games at Franklin Field adjacent to the university's campus in Philadelphia, Pennsylvania.

Schedule

References

Penn
Penn Quakers football seasons
Penn Quakers football